Martin Johansson (born 20 July 1987) is a Swedish professional bandy player.

Career

Club career
Johansson has represented Otterbäcken and Villa Lidköping.

International career
Johansson was selected for the national team in 2013. He was part of Swedish World Champions teams of 2017.

Honours

Country
 Sweden
 Bandy World Championship: 2017

References

External links
 
 

1987 births
Living people
Swedish bandy players
Villa Lidköping BK players
Sweden international bandy players
Bandy World Championship-winning players